Ottaviano Carafa (died 14 April 1666) was a Roman Catholic prelate who served as Titular Archbishop of Patrae (1660–1666).

Biography
On 19 April 1660, Ottaviano Carafa  was appointed during the papacy of Pope Alexander VII as Titular Archbishop of Patrae. On 25 April 1660, he was consecrated bishop by Giulio Cesare Sacchetti, Cardinal-Bishop of Sabina. He served as Titular Archbishop of Patrae until his death on 14 April 1666.

Episcopal succession
While bishop, he was the principal co-consecrator of:

See also
Catholic Church in Italy

References

17th-century Roman Catholic titular bishops
Bishops appointed by Pope Alexander VII
1666 deaths